The 1942 Marquette Hilltoppers football team was an American football team that represented Marquette University as an independent during the 1942 college football season. In its second season under head coach Thomas E. Stidham, the team compiled a 7–2 record and outscored opponents by a total of 193 to 90. Its victories included major college opponents, Kansas, Michigan State, Iowa State, and Arizona, and its two losses were to Wisconsin and Great Lakes Navy. The team played its home games at Marquette Stadium in Milwaukee.

Schedule

References

Marquette
Marquette Golden Avalanche football seasons
Marquette Hilltoppers football